Keinonen is a Finnish surname. Notable people with the surname include:

 Matti Keinonen (1941–2021), Finnish ice hockey player and coach
 Yrjö Keinonen (1912–1977), Finnish general

See also
 Keinänen

Finnish-language surnames